Bitterroot (Lewisia rediviva) is a small perennial herb in the family Montiaceae. Its specific epithet  ("revived, reborn") refers to its ability to regenerate from dry and seemingly dead roots.

The genus Lewisia was moved in 2009 from the purslane family (Portulacaceae) with adoption of the APG III system, which established the family Montiaceae.

Description

Lewisia rediviva is a low-growing perennial plant with a fleshy taproot and a simple or branched base. A single flower appears on each stem with 5–9 oval-shaped sepals. They range in color from whitish to deep pink or lavender. Flowering occurs from April through July. At maturity, the bitterroot produces egg-shaped capsules with 6–20 nearly round seeds.

The thick roots come into season in spring and can survive extremely dry conditions. If collected early enough in the season, they can be peeled, boiled, and made into a jelly-like food.

Distribution
The plant is native to western North America from low to moderate elevations on grassland, open bushland, forest in dry rocky or gravelly soils. Its range extends from southern British Columbia, through Washington and Oregon west of the Cascade Range to southern California, and east to western Montana, Wyoming, northern Colorado and northern Arizona.

History and culture

Native American names include spetlum/sp̓eƛ̓m̓ or spetlem ("hand-peeled"), nakamtcu (Ktanxa: naqam¢u), and mo'ôtáa-heséeo'ôtse (Cheyenne, "black medicine").

The roots were consumed by tribes such as the Shoshone and the Flathead Indians as an infrequent delicacy. Traditionally, the Ktunaxa cooked bitterroot with grouse. For the Ktunaxa, bitterroot is eaten with sugar; other tribes prefer eating it with salt. The Lemhi Shoshone believed the small red core found in the upper taproot had special powers, notably being able to stop a bear attack. Plains Indians peeled and boiled the root prior to its consumption.

Meriwether Lewis ate bitterroot in 1805 and 1806 during the Lewis and Clark Expedition. The specimens he brought back were identified and given their scientific name, Lewisia rediviva, by a German-American botanist, Frederick Pursh.
Based on Lewis and Clark's manuscript, Pursh labeled it "spatlum"; this apparently was actually a Salishan name for "tobacco".

The bitterroot was selected as the Montana state flower in 1895.

Three major geographic features – the Bitterroot Mountains (running north–south and forming the divide between Idaho and Montana), the Bitterroot Valley, and the Bitterroot River (which flows south–north, terminating in the Clark Fork river in the city of Missoula) – owe the origins of their names to this flower.

References

Further reading 
 
 Moerman. D. Native American Ethnobotany. Timber Press. Oregon. 1998

External links 

 Calflora Database: Lewisia rediviva (Bitter root)
 Central Washington Native Plant Society
 Plants of the Lewis and Clark Expedition
 Bitterroot, Lewis and Clark National Historic Trail, U.S. Forest Service
 WSDOT - Ethnobotany - Herbs. Lewisia rediviva - Bitter-root, Sand Rose, Portulacaceae (Purslane Family)

Lewisia
Flora of the Northwestern United States
Flora of the Southwestern United States
Plants used in Native American cuisine
Symbols of Montana
Taxa named by Frederick Traugott Pursh
Flora without expected TNC conservation status